The Warmer Side of Cool is the fifth studio album by Wang Chung released in May 1989 by Geffen Records.  The album was a commercial disappointment, peaking at #123 on the Billboard 200 in its final week on the chart.  Despite poor sales, the album managed to provide a minor hit with "Praying to a New God", which peaked at #63 on the Billboard Hot 100 on May 27, 1989. The album also marked an artistic change from the new wave sound of their previous albums into a more traditional rock sound.

Reception 
The album received 2 of 5 stars from Allmusic's Kelvin Hayes. Hayes concentrated his criticism's on the band's shift into rock from the band's original sound that had made them popular, and that they focused too heavily on the then contemporary mainstream rock music. Apart from the previous criticism, he did praise several of the album's tracks describing them as 'good melodic rock.'

Track listing

CD

Cassette/LP
Side One

Side Two

Chart performance

Personnel
Lead Vocals: Jack Hues
Additional Vocals: Bill Clift, Darren Costin, Gary Falcone, Nick Feldman, Roger Freeland, Jeff Pescetto, Joe Pizzulo, Ina Wolf and Peter Wolf
Tribal Vocals: Bill Clift, Allan Ryder and Peter Wolf
Guitars: Jack Hues, Pete McCray and Mikal Reid
Bass Guitar: Nick Feldman
Drums: Michael Baird, Vinnie Colaiuta and Bryan Hitt
Percussion: Paulinho Da Costa
Vocal Percussion: Jeremy Smith
Trombone: Bill Reichenbach Jr.
Keyboards: Peter Wolf
Mixed by Jeremy Smith
Engineers: Jeremy Smith and Gonzalo "Bino" Espinoza
Assistant Engineers: Gonzalo "Bino" Espinoza and Carlos Golliher
Management: David Massey
Art Direction/Design: Lynn Robb
Collage by Ron Chadwick
Wang Chung photos: Victoria Pearson-Cameron
Photo of Asian boy: Reed Davis
Photo of Kangaroo: Vitamvas/Camera Agency
Photo of Interior: used by kind permission of Atlantic Antique Centres with thanks to Soho Design
Photo of Dolphin: Julia Whitty
Aerial Photography: from The Home Planet © 1988 Kevin W. Kelley. Addison-Wesley Pub. Co.
Album mastered by Stephen Marcussen at Precision Lacquer
Cassette and CD mastered by Dan Hersch at DigiPrep, Los Angeles, CA
John Kalodner
Special Thanks to: David Massey, John Kalodner, David Geffen, Ed Rosenblatt and everyone at Geffen Records (especially Al Coury, Marko Babineau, Peter Napoliello, Jonas Livingston, Norman Beil, Eddie Gilreath, Peter Baron, and Robin Rothman).  Robin Godfrey-Cass, Ronny Vance, Ken Kraus, Nick Ben-Meir, Sandy Campbell, Lynn Robb, Rob Kline, and Bruce Jackson at 41B.  Elaine Black, Debra Shallman, Cathy Woller, Lyn Fey, Roz Schrank, Sigrine Vally, David Chandler, Mikal Reid, Martin Winning (especially for help on "Swing"), Darren Costin, Brian Hitt, Debra Dobkin, and Jeff Naideau.
Thanks too, to: Toru Nittono at L.A. Guitar Works, all at Norm's Rare Guitars, Bill Reim and Chuck Fukagawa at Ibanez Guitars, Chris and Allen at the Bass Centre, L.A., Beverly Lund, Francis and Rick at Bull Hitt Productions, the inventor of 'Asteroids', New England Digital, AKG, Monster Cables, Zildjian Cymbals, and D.W. Drums

References

1989 albums
Geffen Records albums
Wang Chung (band) albums
Albums produced by Peter Wolf